The Defence Inspectorate Directorate is the branch of the Namibian Defence Force responsible for maintaining efficiency and effectiveness of the force. Its main role is to issue corrective measures when shortfalls are detected.

Organisation
Defence Inspectorate Directorate consists of three divisions:

Defence Capabilities Division
It is mandated to capability, Policy oversight and conducting support systems evaluation.

Internal Audit Division
It is mandated to conduct forensic and Information Technology audits, Financial Risk management. The division also carries out Materiel Resources Inspection.

Complaints Division 
It is mandated to investigating complaints, both internal and external.Terry yyyu

Leadership

References

Military of Namibia